The Producers is a collaborative album by Trebol Clan, Dr. Joe & Mr. Frank and released in 2009.

Track listing

Trébol Clan albums
2009 albums